The 2006 NBA Europe Live Tour was an international basketball exhibition and competition produced jointly by the National Basketball Association and the Euroleague, as part of the NBA Global Games.  The tour featured four NBA teams training and playing matches against European teams in Germany, Russia, France, Italy, and Spain. Four standalone games were played, along with two tournaments in Moscow and Cologne. The tour took place between 5 October and 11 October 2006.

Summary
Four NBA teams went to different countries to conduct their first week of training camp overseas: the Philadelphia 76ers in Barcelona, Spain; the Los Angeles Clippers in Moscow, Russia; the San Antonio Spurs in France; and the Phoenix Suns in Treviso, Italy. The 76ers and the Suns also participated in the Cologne tournament won by the former against CSKA Moscow and led by coach Maurice Cheeks. Allen Iverson was the tournament's topscorer. The Clippers finished second in the Moscow tournament won by CSKA Moscow. San Antonio Spurs played only one game, while Clippers played two and 76ers with Suns three (including the Cologne tournament).

Teams
The four NBA teams that participated and the locations of their training camps:
 Philadelphia 76ers, Spain, Cologne 
 San Antonio Spurs, France
 Los Angeles Clippers, Moscow
 Phoenix Suns, Treviso, Cologne 

The European participants:
 BC Khimki, BSL
 CSKA Moscow, BSL
 Lottomatica Roma, Serie A
 Maccabi Tel Aviv
 Barcelona, ACB
 ASVEL Basket

Games

In France, Italy and Spain

In Moscow (tournament)

In Cologne (tournament)

The tournament was played in a Final Four system as follows:

Cologne Tournament Topscorer:  Allen Iverson (57 pts)

Significance
Many legendary NBA coaches led their teams in the first edition of the Europe Live Tour, such as Mike Dunleavy Sr. and Greg Popovich, while Mike D'Antoni was the only to coach both in USA and Europe. Ettore Messina was in charge of CSKA Moscow, Dusko Ivanovic of Barcelona and Jasmin Repesa of Roma. 
The 76ers' loss to FC Barcelona and the Clippers' loss to CSKA Moscow marked the fifth and sixth losses by NBA franchises to Euroleague teams since 1978.
Prior to this tournament only Maccabi Tel Aviv (4 times: 1978, 1984 twice, 2005) and the Soviet Union National Team (once in 1988) had beaten an NBA team.

See also
 List of NBA versus international games
 McDonald's Championship

Sources
2006 Live tour
Historical standings
Attendances

External links
 NBA Europe Live Tour 2006

NBA Global Games
Europe
2006–07 Euroleague